Coltrane's Sound is an album credited to jazz musician John Coltrane, recorded in 1960  and released in 1964 on Atlantic Records, catalogue SD 1419. It was recorded at Atlantic Studios during the sessions for My Favorite Things, assembled after Coltrane had stopped recording for the label and was under contract to Impulse! Records. Like Prestige and Blue Note Records before them, as Coltrane's fame grew during the 1960s Atlantic used unissued recordings and released them without either Coltrane's input or approval.

On February 16, 1999, Rhino Records reissued Coltrane's Sound as part of its Atlantic 50th Anniversary Jazz Gallery series. Included were two bonus tracks: "26-2" had been previously released on the 1970 album The Coltrane Legacy; and the alternate take of "Body and Soul" had been released on the 1975 album Alternate Takes.

Track listing

Side one

Side two

1999 reissue bonus tracks

Personnel
 John Coltrane —  tenor saxophone on all except "Central Park West" soprano saxophone on "Central Park West" and "26-2";
 McCoy Tyner — piano except “Satellite”
 Steve Davis — bass
 Elvin Jones — drums

Production personnel
 Nesuhi Ertegün — production
 Tom Dowd — engineering
 Marvin Israel — photography
 Ralph J. Gleason — liner notes
 Bob Carlton, Patrick Milligan — reissue supervision
 Dan Hersch — digital remastering
 Rachel Gutek — reissue design
 Hugh Brown — reissue art direction
 Kenny Berger — reissue liner notes
 Steven Chean — reissue editorial supervision
 Elizabeth Pavone — reissue editorial coordination

References

1964 albums
Albums produced by Nesuhi Ertegun
Atlantic Records albums
John Coltrane albums